Bryum cyclophyllum, round-leaved bryum, is a species of moss belonging to the family Bryaceae.

It is native to the Northern Hemisphere.

References

cyclophyllum